Toqui (or Toki) (Mapudungun for axe or axe-bearer) is a title conferred by the Mapuche (an indigenous Chilean and Argentinian people) on those chosen as leaders during times of war.  The toqui is chosen in an assembly or parliament (coyag) of the chieftains (loncos) of various clans (Rehues) or confederation of clans (Aillarehues), allied during the war at hand. The toqui commanded strict obedience of all the warriors and their loncos during the war, would organize them into units and appoint leaders over them.  This command would continue until the toqui was killed, abdicated (Cayancaru), was deposed in another parliament (as in the case of Lincoyan, for poor leadership), or upon completion of the war for which he was chosen.

Some of the more famous Toqui in the Arauco War with the Spanish introduced tactical innovations. For example, Lautaro introduced infantry tactics to defeat horsemen. Lemucaguin was the first Toqui to use firearms and artillery in battle. Nongoniel was the first Toqui to use cavalry with the Mapuche army.  Cadeguala was the first to successfully use Mapuche cavalry to defeat Spanish cavalry in battle.  Anganamón was the first to mount his infantry to keep up with his fast-moving cavalry. Lientur pioneered the tactic of numerous and rapid malóns into Spanish territory.

The greatest of the Toqui was the older Paillamachu, who developed the strategy, patiently organized and trained his forces and then with his two younger Vice Toqui, Pelantaro and Millacolquin, carried out the Great Revolt of 1598–1604 which finally expelled the Spanish from Araucania.

List of Mapuche Toquis 

The following Mapuche leaders were at some time named as toquis:
 Malloquete 1546 †
 Ainavillo, Aynabillo or Aillavilú 1550 †
 Lincoyan 1551–1553
 Caupolicán 1553–1558 ††
 Lautaro Vice Toqui 1553–1557 † 
 Turcupichun 1557–1558 ††
 Lemucaguin or Caupolicán the younger 1558 †
 Illangulién, Quiromanite, Queupulien or Antiguenu 1559–1564 †
 Millalelmo or Millarelmo or Antunecul 1562–1570
 Loble or Lig-lemu or Lillemu Vice Toqui 1563–1565
 Paillataru 1564–1574
 Llanganabal 1569
 Paineñamcu or Paynenancu, originally Alonso Diaz 1574–1584 ††
 Cayancaru or Cayeucura 1584
 Nongoniel or Mangolien 1585 †
 Cadeguala or Cadiguala 1585–1586 †
 Guanoalca or Huenualca 1586–1590
 Quintuguenu 1591 †
 Paillaeco 1592 †
 Paillamachu 1592–1603
 Pelantaro Vice Toqui
 Millacolquin Vice Toqui
 Huenecura or Huenencura 1604–1610 
 Aillavilu, Aillavilú II, Aillavilu Segundo 1610–1612 
 Anganamón,<ref>Rosales, Historia general ..., Tomo II'</ref> Ancanamon or Ancanamun 1612–1613
 Loncothegua 1613–1620
 Lientur 1621–1625
 Levipillan Vice Toqui
 Butapichón or Butapichún 1625–1631
 Quepuantú or Quempuante 1631–1632 †
 Butapichón or Butapichún 1632–1634 
 Huenucalquin 1634–1635 †
 Curanteo 1635 †
 Curimilla 1635–1639 †
 Lincopinchon 1640–1641
 Clentaru 1655
 Mestizo Alejo or Ñancú 1656–1661 @
 Misqui 1661–1663 †
 Colicheuque 1663 †
 Udalevi 1664–1665 †
 Calbuñancü vice toqui 1664–1665 †
 Ayllicuriche or Huaillacuriche 1672–1673 †
 Millalpal Vicente Carvallo Goyeneche, Descripcion Histórico Geografía del Reino de Chile, Tomo II, Primera parte, Capítulo LXIV or Millapán'' 1692–1694
 Vilumilla 1722–1726
 Curiñancu 1766–1774 
 Lebian Vice Toqui

†  Killed in battle or †† executed for rebellion or @ assassinated.

References

Sources 
  Juan Ignatius Molina, The Geographical, Natural, and Civil History of Chili, Vol II., Longman, Hurst, Rees, and Orme, London, 1809
  José Ignacio Víctor Eyzaguirre, Historia eclesiastica: Politica y literaria de Chile, IMPRENTA DEL COMERCIO, VALPARAISO, June 1830 List of Toquis, pg. 162–163, 498–500.

Mapuche
 
Military history of Chile

Titles of national or ethnic leadership
Mapuche words and phrases